This timeline is an incomplete list of significant events of human migration and exploration by sea. This timeline does not include migration and exploration over land, including migration across land that has subsequently submerged beneath the sea, such as the initial settlement of Great Britain and Ireland.

Maritime migration and exploration

See also

Age of Discovery
Ancient maritime history
Chinese exploration
Chronology of European exploration of Asia
Colonization
Columbian exchange
Early human migrations
European exploration of Africa
History of navigation
History of slavery
Human migration
Indian maritime history
Major explorations after the Age of Discovery
Maritime history
Maritime history of Europe
Maritime Silk Road
Maritime timeline
Ming treasure voyages
Naval history of China
Polynesian navigation
Portuguese maritime exploration
Spanish colonization of the Americas
Timeline of European exploration
Timeline of prehistory
Timeline of the Ming treasure voyages
Treaty of Tordesillas
Voyages of Christopher Columbus

References
References are included in the linked articles.

External links

Maritime timelines
Historical geography
History of immigration
Origins
Social history-related lists